See also 1721 in piracy, 1723 in piracy and Timeline of piracy.

Events

Atlantic Ocean

Caribbean Sea
March -  seized and robbed by Spanish subjects.
March–April - Matthew Luke, Spanish guardacostas, plunders four British vessels, killing all aboard.
He is later hanged there with all but seven of his crew.

Indian Ocean

West Africa
February 5 - Bartholomew Roberts' consort vessel, Ranger, captured by Chaloner Ogle.
Roberts was killed and his crew captured.
March 28 - 54 of Roberts' pirates are sentenced to death at Cape Coast Castle.

Deaths
February 10 - Bartholomew Roberts, who reportedly robbed 470 vessels in his career, killed in action off Cape López.

References 

Piracy
Piracy by year
1722 in military history